An Oxford shoe is characterized by shoelace eyelets tabs that are attached under the vamp, a feature termed "closed lacing". This contrasts with Derbys, or bluchers, which have shoelace eyelets attached to the top of the vamp. Originally, Oxfords were plain, formal shoes, made of leather, but they evolved into a range of styles suitable for formal, uniform, or casual wear. On the basis of function and the dictates of fashion, Oxfords are now made from a variety of materials, including calf leather, faux and genuine patent leather, suede, and canvas. They are normally black or brown, and may be plain or patterned (brogue).

Terminology
The meaning of "Oxford" and "balmoral" may vary geographically. In the United States and Scotland, "Balmoral" is often synonymous with "Oxford". In the United States, "Oxford" is sometimes used for any more formal lace-up shoe, including the Blucher and Derby. In Britain and other countries, the Balmoral is an Oxford with no seams, apart from the toe cap seam, descending to the welt, a style common on boots.  Oxford shoes are also known for their variation or style. The Cap-Toe Oxford is the most well-known, although 'Whole Cut', 'Plain Toe', and a variation of 'Brogue' Oxfords are commonly referred to styles.  Shoes with closed lacing (Oxfords/Balmorals) are considered more formal than those with open lacing (Bluchers/Derbys).  A particular type of oxford shoe is the wholecut oxford, it's upper made from a single piece of leather with only a single seam at the back or in the rare exception no seams at all.

History

Oxfords first appeared in Scotland and Ireland, where they are occasionally called Balmorals after Balmoral Castle. However, the shoes were later named Oxfords after Oxford University. This shoe style did not appear in North America until the 1800s. In the United States, Oxfords are called "Bal-type" as opposed to "Blucher-type". In France, Oxfords are known as Richelieu.

Oxfords were derived from the Oxonian, a half-boot with side slits that gained popularity at Oxford University in 1800. Unlike early shoes, Oxfords were cut smaller than the foot. The side slit evolved into a side lace that eventually moved to the instep, as students rebelled against knee-high and ankle-high boots. The toe cap can either be lined with two narrow rows of stitching, perforated holes along the end cap stitching (quarter-brogue), perforated holes along the end cap stitching and on the toe cap (semi-brogue), or a semi-brogue with the classical wingtip design (full-brogue).

See also

Blucher
Brogue
Derby
Saddle
Spectator
Wholecut

References

Shoes
Culture of the University of Oxford

pt:Sapato clássico#Oxford